Nemospiza is a genus of African orb-weaver spiders containing the single species, Nemospiza conspicillata. It was first described by Eugène Simon in 1903, and is known only from a female found in South Africa.

References

Araneidae
Monotypic Araneomorphae genera
Spiders of South Africa
Taxa named by Eugène Simon